Zero: Fever Epilogue (stylized in all caps) is the eighth extended play (EP) by South Korean boy band Ateez. It was released on December 10, 2021, through KQ Entertainment, RCA Records, and Legacy Recordings. It consists of ten tracks, including the singles "Turbulence" and "The Real (Heung version)". The EP debuted atop South Korea Gaon Album Chart and Billboard's World Albums Chart. The group made their second appearance on the Billboard 200 chart with the EP at number 73. The album was certified platinum by the Korea Music Content Association, selling over 407,000 physical copies in December 2021.

Release and promotion 

On November 27, 2021, Ateez posted a teaser picture captioned 'Upon the new world' on their social media accounts for the upcoming album, titled Zero: Fever Epilogue.  The music video of "Turbulence" was uploaded on December 3. The EP was released on December 10, alongside the music video of "The Real (Heung version)", re-arranged from "The Real" which was released for the final round of Mnet's competitive show Kingdom: Legendary War. Sidetracks "Wave (Overture)", "Wonderland (Symphony No.9 "From the Wonderland")" and "Answer: Ode to Joy" were all first introduced as performances on Kingdom.

Ateez gave the debut performances of "Turbulence" and "The Real (Heung version)" at the 2021 Mnet Asian Music Awards on December 11, a day after the EP release. The group promoted the songs on several music programs, including The Show, Show Champion, Show! Music Core, and Inkigayo. They also guested on Idol Radio and Kiss the Radio for album promotion.

On December 25, Ateez upload a 'Christmas special clip' of the B-side "The Letter". They joined as the series' first guest on the It's Live Original concert show launching on December 30. They brought live band sessions of "Turbulence" and few other songs, as well as a performance of "The Real (Heung version)" filmed in the Daejanggeum Theme Park.

Track listing

Charts

Weekly charts

Monthly charts

Year-end charts

Accolades

References 

2021 EPs
Ateez albums
K-pop EPs